Ángel Baena Pérez (born 13 October 2000) is a Spanish footballer who plays as a right winger for CD Lugo.

Club career
Born in Santa Coloma de Gramenet, Barcelona, Catalonia, Baena joined Real Betis' youth setup in 2017, from CF Damm. He made his senior debut with the reserves on 14 April of the following year, coming on as a second-half substitute and scoring the equalizer in a 2–2 Segunda División B away draw against FC Jumilla.

On 17 December 2019, after finishing his formation, Baena renewed with the Verdiblancos until 2022. He was a regular starter during that campaign onwards, helping in the B's promotion to the third division and subsequent qualification to the newly-created Primera División RFEF.

On 29 June 2022, Baena signed a three-year contract with Segunda División side CD Lugo. He made his professional debut on 15 August, starting in a 2–1 home loss against Albacete Balompié.

References

External links

2000 births
Living people
People from Santa Coloma de Gramenet
Sportspeople from the Province of Barcelona
Spanish footballers
Footballers from Catalonia
Association football wingers
Segunda División players
Primera Federación players
Segunda División B players
Tercera División players
Betis Deportivo Balompié footballers
CD Lugo players